The 2009 Jacksonville State Gamecocks football team represented Jacksonville State University as a member of the Ohio Valley Conference (OVC) during the 2009 NCAA Division I FCS football season. Led by tenth-year head coach Jack Crowe, the Gamecocks compiled an overall record of 8–3 with a mark of 6–1 in conference, finishing first in the OVC. However, Jacksonville State was ineligible for the conference championship and the NCAA Division I Football Championship playoffs due to Academic Progress Rate (APR) violations. Eastern Illinois won the OVC title and earned the conference's automatic bid to the playoffs. Jacksonville State played home games at Paul Snow Stadium in Jacksonville, Alabama.

Schedule

References

Jacksonville State
Jacksonville State Gamecocks football seasons
Jacksonville State Gamecocks football